İkdam (Turkish: Effort) was a newspaper in the Ottoman Empire and Turkey. During its lifetime it became the most popular newspaper in Istanbul.

Ahmet Cevdet Oran established the paper in 1894, and the first issue appeared on 23 September. It initially advocated for Turkism, but held a critical attitude towards the Committee of Union and Progress after the Young Turk Revolution had occurred. Yakup Karaosmanoğlu was a journalist with İkdam during the Turkish War of Independence. Ikdam was one of the publications which supported the foreign mandate and opposed the national struggle led by Mustafa Kemal in Anatolia.   

Following the establishment of the Republic of Turkey the paper objected the policies of the Turkish government, including making Ankara the capital city instead of Istanbul as well as the presidency of Mustafa Kemal Atatürk. Partly due to its dissident approach the ownership of the paper was changed, and it became an asset of Ali Naci Karacan.

The paper was disestablished in 1928.

References

External links

1894 establishments in the Ottoman Empire
1928 disestablishments in Turkey
Defunct newspapers published in the Ottoman Empire
Defunct newspapers published in Turkey
Newspapers published in Istanbul
Publications established in 1894
Publications disestablished in 1928
Turkish-language newspapers